Doillon is a surname. Notable people with the surname include: 

Jacques Doillon (born 1944), French film director
Lola Doillon (born 1975), French director and screenwriter, daughter of Jacques
Lou Doillon (born 1982), French singer-songwriter, artist, actress and model, daughter of Jacques